Patrick Johnson (born January 10, 1998) is an American football outside linebacker for the Philadelphia Eagles of the National Football League (NFL). He played college football at Tulane.

Early life and high school
Johnson grew up in Chattanooga, Tennessee and attended Notre Dame High School.

College career
Johnson played for the Tulane Green Wave for four seasons. After serving as a reserve outside linebacker as a freshman, he became a starting edge rusher going into his sophomore year and was named second-team All-American Athletic Conference (AAC) after leading the team with 10.5 sacks, 16 tackles for loss and four forced fumbles. Johnson was named second-team All-AAC for a second straight season after recording four sacks and 8.5 tackles for loss with four passes broken up as a junior. Johnson was named first-team All-AAC after finishing his senior season with 39 tackles, 14.5 tackles for loss, 10 sacks with two forced fumbles. He was also named a second-team All-American by the Walter Camp Football Foundation, The Sporting News, and the Football Writers Association of America. Johnson finished his collegiate career as Tulane's career leader in sacks with 24.5.

Professional career

Johnson was selected in the seventh round with the 234th overall pick of the 2021 NFL Draft by the Philadelphia Eagles.

References

External links
Philadelphia Eagles bio
Tulane Green Wave bio

Living people
Players of American football from Tennessee
American football defensive ends
Tulane Green Wave football players
Sportspeople from Chattanooga, Tennessee
Philadelphia Eagles players
1998 births